Liutauras Barila (born 10 February 1974) is a Lithuanian biathlete. He competed at the 1998 Winter Olympics and the 2002 Winter Olympics.

References

External links
 

1974 births
Living people
Lithuanian male biathletes
Olympic biathletes of Lithuania
Biathletes at the 1998 Winter Olympics
Biathletes at the 2002 Winter Olympics
Sportspeople from Vilnius